Robert Bockstael (born May 2, 1960) is a Canadian actor, director and writer.

Career
He is best known for his lead role as Royal Canadian Mounted Police officer Brian Fletcher in the Canadian television drama series North of 60, for which he was a two-time Gemini Award nominee for Best Actor in a Continuing Leading Dramatic Role at the 11th Gemini Awards in 1997 and the 12th Gemini Awards in 1998.

His other leads and series regular roles have included Jim Flett in Wind at My Back, Jeremy Woodsworm in Snakes and Ladders, Roy McMurtry in Trudeau, Joey Stiglic in Our Hero and Mr. Dupree in The Famous Jett Jackson, as well as voice roles in Silver Surfer, Sailor Moon, Friends and Heroes, X-Men, Tales from the Cryptkeeper , Monster Force, Robocop, Super Mario Brothers, Dennis the Menace, Magic School Bus, Max and Ruby, Maxie's World, Rupert, Babar, The Adventures of Teddy Ruxpin and The Animal Shelf.

On stage, his noted roles have included productions of George F. Walker's plays Nothing Sacred, Zastrozzi, The Master of Discipline and Beautiful City. He has performed in theatres across Canada in his one-man show Getting to Room Temperature. He was co-artistic director of the New Theatre of Ottawa as well as associate artistic director of the Great Canadian Theatre Company in Ottawa. He has directed, produced and written for film and television and is a published author of short stories. His debut novel, Willow's Run, was published in April of 2022.

Personal life
Originally from Winnipeg, Manitoba, he is the nephew of former federal Member of Parliament Robert Bockstael.

Filmography

Film

Television

References

External links

Canadian male film actors
Canadian male stage actors
Canadian male television actors
Canadian male voice actors
Canadian theatre directors
Male actors from Winnipeg
Living people
20th-century Canadian male actors
21st-century Canadian male actors
1960 births
Canadian people of Belgian descent